Orcus Patera is a region on the surface of the planet Mars first photographed by Mariner 4.

Description
Orcus Patera was first imaged by Mariner 4.

It has experienced aeolian processes, and has some small craters and graben structures. However, it is not known how the patera originally formed. Theories include volcanic, tectonic, or cratering events. A study in 2000 that incorporated new results from Mars Global Surveyor along with older Viking data, did not come out clearly in favor of either volcanic or cratering processes.

Mars Express observed this region in 2005, yielding a digital terrain model and color pictures.

Images

Viking

Mars Express

Location
Orcus Patera is west of Olympus Mons and east of Elysium Mons. It is about halfway between those two volcanoes, and east and north of Gale crater.

See also
Marte Vallis
Tartarus Colles
Schiller (crater) (elongated Lunar feature)
Eden Patera (suspect collapsed caldera or impact crater)

External links
ESA - Mars’s mysterious elongated crater (27 August 2010)
Google Mars - Orcus Patera
Crater in Orcus Patera (MRO HiRISE)
http://www.uahirise.org/results.php?keyword=Orcus+Patera&order=release_date&submit=Search
Orcus Patera : Impact Crater or Volcanic Caldera? (2000)

References

Surface features of Mars
Depressions (geology)